Victor Kurnatovsky graduated from the Zurich University and was an engineer by trade.

He began his revolutionary career with the Narodnaya Volya (People's Will) party. Later, after his third exile, he came to know Lenin and his circle. Kurnatovsky became a representative of the Iskra-group in the Caucasus. In 1900, the Tiflis Committee of the Russian Social-Democratic Labour Party was established upon his initiative. He was in charge of the May-Day demonstrations in Tiflis, but was arrested on 22 March 1901 and spent two years in prison after which he was deported to Yakut Region. On his escape from Yakutsk he participated in the armed resistance of the exiles against the authorities, for which he was sentenced to twelve years' hard labour. After being amnestied, in the 1905 revolution he became the chairman of the Soviet of Workers', Soldiers' and Cossacks' Deputies in Chita, often referred to as the Chita Republic.

After the events of the Chita Republic he was sentenced to death. He was carried in the train of General Rennenkampf and had to witness the execution of workers at every railway station. His sentence was later commuted to exile for life. In 1906 he managed to escape from Nerchinsk to Japan, and from Japan to Australia. In 1910 he arrived in Paris where he again met with Krupskaya and Lenin.

He died in 1912.

References

Year of birth missing
1912 deaths
Russian engineers
Narodnaya Volya